Richmond Hill Transit was created in 1960 to provide public transit service in Richmond Hill, Ontario, Canada. It was initially operated by Trailways of Canada Limited, then Travelways starting in 1976 and Laidlaw in the 1980s. Services merged with the Markham, Newmarket and Vaughan transit systems to form York Region Transit in 2001.

Richmond Hill Transit services were limited due to the size and geography of the town when compared to transit operations in adjacent Markham and Vaughan.

Routes
Richmond Hill's routes were similar to Vaughan Transit as they did not run in a grid like direction:

 1A Mill Pond
 1C Beverly Acres
 2 Newkirk
 3 Trench
 4A/C Oak Ridges
 5 16th Avenue
 6 Weldrick
 7 Major Mackenzie
 8 Bathurst

When Richmond Hill Transit merged with other transit systems to form York Region Transit, an "8" was added to all of then-Richmond Hill's route numbers to avoid having duplicate bus route number with other transit systems (e.g. 1A Mill Street becomes 81A Mill Street). This numbering system stands after the merge.

Fleet
 Total buses: 26
 1978–1981 Ontario Bus Industries Orion I 1.501 (#504–507) – retired
 1985, 1987 Ontario Bus Industries Orion I 1.502 (#508–509) – retired
 1981 Ontario Bus Industries Orion I 1.503 (#510) – Ex-GO Transit #1508, retired
 1988, 1991 Ontario Bus Industries Orion II 2.502 (#525-#527) 
 1989 New Flyer Industries D40 (#511-#524) – renumbered to #8911-#8924 retired 2009
 1998 Champion Bus Incorporated Solo (#528-#530) – renumbered to #9828-#9830, retired
 1999 Orion Bus Industries Orion VI 06.501 (#531-#533) – renumbered to #9931-#9933, retired in 2013 
 Prevost Car Coaches H3-41
 Prevost Car Coaches H3-45
 Motor Coach Industries MC-9

 denotes wheelchair access

Facilities

Richmond Hill Transit buses were maintained by private contractors:

 Pacific Western Toronto Bus Lines – Division 1 (Richmond Hill based buses) – since replaced by Miller Transit Limited
 Laidlaw Transit Limited – Division 2 (Newmarket, Aurora, East Gwillimbury and Georgina based buses)

See also

 Toronto Transit Commission
 GO Transit
 Viva (bus rapid transit)
 North Yonge Railways – provide transit service to the Yonge Street area of Richmond Hill from 1930 to 1948
 Metropolitan / Lake Simcoe Line – provided transit service to the Yonge Street area of Richmond Hill from 1897 to 1930

References

Notes 
 Transit History...Richmond Hill
 York Region Transit

Transport in Richmond Hill, Ontario
Transit agencies in Ontario
York Region Transit